Postminimalism is an art term coined (as post-minimalism) by Robert Pincus-Witten in 1971 and used in various artistic fields for work which is influenced by, or attempts to develop and go beyond, the aesthetic of minimalism. The expression is used specifically in relation to music and the visual arts, but can refer to any field using minimalism as a critical reference point. 
In music, "postminimalism" refers to music following minimal music.

Visual art

In visual art, postminimalist art uses minimalism either as an aesthetic or conceptual reference point. Postminimalism is more an artistic tendency than a particular movement.  Postminimalist artworks are usually everyday objects, use simple materials, and sometimes take on a "pure", formalist aesthetic. However, since postminimalism includes such a diverse and disparate group of artists, it is impossible to enumerate all the continuities and similarities between them.

The work of Eva Hesse is also postminimalist: it uses "grids" and "seriality", themes often found in minimalism, but is also usually hand-made, introducing a human element into her art, in contrast to the machine or custom-made works of minimalism. Richard Serra is a prominent post-minimalist.

Music

 
In its general musical usage, "postminimalism" refers to works influenced by minimal music, and it is generally categorized within the meta-genre art music. Writer Kyle Gann has employed the term more strictly to denote the style that flourished in the 1980s and 1990s and characterized by: 
a steady pulse, usually continuing throughout a work or movement; 
a diatonic pitch language, tonal in effect but avoiding traditional functional tonality; 
general evenness of dynamics, without strong climaxes or nuanced emotionalism; and 
unlike minimalism, an avoidance of obvious or linear formal design.

Minimalist procedures such as additive and subtractive process are common in postminimalism, though usually in disguised form, and the style has also shown a capacity for absorbing influences from world and popular music (Balinese gamelan, bluegrass, Jewish cantillation, and so on).

For a musical style derived from minimalism, see Totalism (music).

See also
 
 Holy minimalism
 Lyrical Abstraction
 Neo-expressionism
 New York School
 Fluxus
 Casualism
 Conceptual art
 Appropriation (art)
 Institutional Critique
 Postmodern art
 Art software
 Computer art
 Internet art
 Electronic art
 Systems art
 Cyberarts
 New Media 
 New Media Art
 Computer generated music
 Generative art
 Monochrome painting
 Neo-minimalism
 Timbral listening
 Post-conceptual

References

External links
 Minimal Music, Maximal Impact by Kyle Gann © 2001 NewMusicBox
 A Discography of Postminimal, Totalist, and Rare Minimalist Music by Kyle Gann
 MINUS SPACE reductive art

1971 neologisms
20th-century classical music
Contemporary classical music
Contemporary art movements
1970s in art
1980s in art
1990s in art